The 24th People's Choice Awards, honoring the best in popular culture for 1997, were held on January 11, 1998, at the Pasadena Civic Auditorium in Pasadena, California. They were hosted by Reba McEntire and Ray Romano, and broadcast on CBS.

Whoopi Goldberg received a special award for her work in the motion picture and television industry.

Awards
Winners are listed first, in bold.

References

External links
1998 People's Choice.com

People's Choice Awards
1998 awards in the United States
1998 in California
January 1998 events in the United States